Elsa Burnett (1902 – 1999) was a Swedish stage and film actress.

Early life 
On 10 December 1902, Burnett was born in Stockholm, Sweden.

Filmography 
 1928 Gustaf Wasa - as daughter at  Svärdsjögården. Credited as Elsa Lundqvist.
 1932 Tango 
 1938 Dollar - as Mary Jonston.
 1939 Emilie Högquist 
 1939 Variety Is the Spice of Life
 1944 Den heliga lögnen - as Helen Wahlman. (In Swedish).

References

Bibliography
 Lawrence J. Quirk. The films of Ingrid Bergman. Carol Pub Group, 1975.

External links

 
 

1902 births
1999 deaths
Actresses from Stockholm
Swedish film actresses
Swedish stage actresses
20th-century Swedish actresses